David Lan Hong-Tsung GBS, ISO, JP (born 29 May 1940) is a former politician and civil servant in Hong Kong who served as the Secretary for Home Affairs from September 1997 to 7 July 2000. He is currently a National Committee Member of the Chinese People's Political Consultative Conference representing Hong Kong, serving in that post since January 2003.

David is also a businessman who currently serves as an Independent Non Executive Director of SJM Holdings Limited and Hutchison Telecommunications Hong Kong Holdings since 2008.

Awards
2000: Gold Bauhinia Star
2001: Justice of the Peace

References

Place of birth missing (living people)
Government officials of Hong Kong
Living people
New Century Forum politicians
Recipients of the Gold Bauhinia Star
Alumni of University of London Worldwide
Alumni of the University of London
Harvard Business School alumni
Hong Kong people of Hakka descent
People from Dabu
1940 births
Companions of the Imperial Service Order
Hong Kong justices of the peace